Acer undulatum is a species of maple, endemic to Babadağ near Fethiye in Muğla Province, southwestern Turkey, where it grows at altitudes of between 1,400 and 1,800 meters.

References

undulatum
Flora of Turkey
Near threatened plants
Plants described in 1976
Taxonomy articles created by Polbot